Prillwitz idols is a large number of bronze figurines and bronze relief plates allegedly found in late 17th century. The first publication about them, in 1768, further claimed that the figurines found by the village of Prillwitz (now part of Hohenzieritz) came from a pagan shrine in Rethra, a major town of Polabian Slavs, and Prillwitz is the location of Rethra.

While the story was questioned from the very beginning, many experts believed their authenticity, and disputes about them continued well into the 19th century. Finally, with the progress in research techniques in archaeology have led to the conclusion that the technique of some of the molds was from recent times, while others, while being apparently authentic, had no evidence of the connection with Slavic peoples. 

Nowadays Slavic neopagans  insist that further research may confirm their authenticity.

References

Archaeological forgeries
Fakelore
Slavic neopaganism
Religious hoaxes